Harold Willis (born June 8, 1946) is a Canadian former professional ice hockey defenceman.

Career 
During the 1972–73 season, Willis played 74 games in the World Hockey Association (WHA) with the New York Raiders, and during the 1973–74 season he played another 18 games in the WHA with the Los Angeles Sharks.

References

External links

1946 births
Living people
Canadian ice hockey defencemen
Charlotte Checkers (EHL) players
Denver Spurs players
Greensboro Generals (SHL) players
Hampton Gulls (SHL) players
Ice hockey people from Nova Scotia
Long Island Ducks (ice hockey) players
Los Angeles Sharks players
Phoenix Roadrunners (WHL) players
Rochester Americans players
Seattle Totems (WHL) players
Canadian expatriate ice hockey players in the United States